Potlach is an animated television series, co-produced in France and Italy, produced by ELLIPSANIME. 26 episodes aired on the French television network France 3 during the summer of 2006. The series follows the lives of anthropomorphic farm animals, that live on a farm without humans.

The series has been dubbed into English, and has been released on DVD.

See also
List of French animated television series

References

External links
 Potlach on IMDB
 

2000s French animated television series
French children's animated comedy television series
French computer-animated television series
Animated television series about mammals